Mohammad Amin Wakman ( - born 1939) is the Honorary Chairman and Director of International Affairs of Afghan Millat Party.

Mohammad Amin Wakman was born on November 1, 1939 in Maidan Wardag Province of Afghanistan. He is the son of Brigadier Mia Sahib Khan.

Education
Amin completed his primary education in Maidan Wardag Province and secondary education in the High School of Business and Commerce in Kabul.

In 1964, he graduated from the Faculty of Journalism of Kabul University.

Amin received a Master of Arts, Master of Philosophy and Ph.D in political science, diplomatic studies and international affairs from Jawaharlal Nehru University, New Delhi, India .

Work life
After completing his secondary education, Amin worked with the United Nations mission in Kabul. In 1965, he served as a reservist in the Afghan Army.

After completing his time in the Afghan Army, he was appointed as the Chief of Protocol in the Ministry of Information and Culture of Afghanistan.

Amin was appointed as a Pashto broadcaster with Radio Ankara, Turkey. He was assigned as the director of information and culture of Jowzjan Province and the chief editor of Deewa Daily newspaper when he returned to Afghanistan. Later on, he worked with All India Radio as a Pashto broadcaster. Amin ended his career with the Afghan Government in April 1978, after the communist coup.

Amin also worked as a writer and broadcaster with Voice of America in Washington, D.C., United States.

Party involvement
In 1966, Amin took part in the establishment of the Afghan Mellat Party. He was elected as the Secretary General of the Afghan Mellat party when it was in exile in Peshawar.

As a representative of Afghan Mellat party, Amin attended World Congress of the Social Democratic Parties in 1980, 1984 and 1988 in Spain and Portugal, 1992 in Berlin, Germany and 1997 in New York City, USA.
 
Amin was elected as the Chairman of the party in 1987 in Peshawar and re-elected to the same position in the mid-term election in 1989. He was elected as the Honorary Chairman and Director of International Affairs of the party in the fourth general congress.

Academic works
Amin Wakman has written several books and more than six hundred articles in Pashto, Dari and English languages.  He is the author of the following books:

Books in English 
 Afghanistan At the Crossroads
 Afghanistan, Non-Alignment and the Super Powers (February 1986)

Books in Pashto
 Social Democracy
 De Afghanistan Milli Nahzatoona - دافغانستان ملي نهضتونه

References 

Afghan writers
Pashtun people
Pashtun nationalists
Living people
1939 births
Afghan Millat Party politicians